Richard Purchase (1757 – 1837) was an English cricketer who played for the Hambledon Club, making his debut aged 16 in 1773.

Born in Liss, Hampshire, he played for his county in 1773 and 1774 but then did not appear again until 1781. He was an all-rounder noted as a slow bowler who maintained good line and length and a "fair hitter".  He played regularly from 1781 until the end of his career in 1803, making 113 known first-class appearances.

References
 Fresh Light on 18th Century Cricket by G B Buckley
 The Dawn of Cricket by H T Waghorn
 Scores & Biographies, Volume 1 by Arthur Haygarth
 The Glory Days of Cricket by Ashley Mote
 John Nyren's "The Cricketers of my Time" by Ashley Mote

English cricketers
Hampshire cricketers
English cricketers of 1701 to 1786
English cricketers of 1787 to 1825
1757 births
1837 deaths
People from Liss
Hambledon cricketers
Marylebone Cricket Club cricketers
Kent cricketers
White Conduit Club cricketers
Left-Handed v Right-Handed cricketers
Old Etonians cricketers
East Kent cricketers
Non-international England cricketers
Brighton cricketers
Hampshire and Marylebone Cricket Club cricketers